Dinesh Bajaj is an Indian politician who previously belonged to Trinamool Congress. He was elected as MLA of Jorasanko in 2006. His father Satya Narayan Bajaj was a legislator of West Bengal Legislative Assembly. On 31 March 2021, Bajaj joined the Bharatiya Janata Party

References

Living people
Trinamool Congress politicians from West Bengal
West Bengal MLAs 2006–2011
1969 births